Chamazulene is an aromatic chemical compound with the molecular formula C14H16 found in a variety of plants including in chamomile (Matricaria chamomilla), wormwood (Artemisia absinthium), and yarrow (Achillea millefolium).  It is a blue-violet derivative of azulene which is biosynthesized from the sesquiterpene matricin.

Chamazulene has anti-inflammatory properties in vivo and inhibits the CYP1A2 enzyme.

References

Azulenes
Hydrocarbons